Hercules first appeared in Lloyd's Register in 1812, with origin America. In 1813 she appeared in the Register of Shipping with origin Britain. She had undergone a repairs in 1812. She made two voyages as a whaler in the Southern Whale Fishery and then was no longer listed in 1818.

Career
Although one source describes Hercules as a prize, she sailed under British colours well before the outbreak of the War of 1812.

She first appeared in Lloyd's Register (LR) in the volume for 1812,<ref name=LR1812>[https://hdl.handle.net/2027/mdp.39015005667814?urlappend=%3Bseq=633 '"LR (1812), Supple. pages "H", Seq.no.H31.]</ref>and in the Register of Shipping (RS) in the volume for 1813.

1st whaling voyage (1812–1814): Captain Simon Coleman sailed from London on 19 March 1812, bound for the South Seas. In late September, the "Hercules whaler" was at St Helena. Hercules returned to London on 31 March 1814.<ref name=bswf>[https://whalinghistory.org/bv/voyages/ British Southern Whale Fishery − Voyages: Hercules]</ref> She again underwent a good repair in 1814.

In 1813 the British East India Company (EIC) had lost its monopoly on the trade between India and Britain. British ships were then free to sail to India or the Indian Ocean under a licence from the EIC. Herculess owners applied for a licence to sail to certain ports in the East Indies under the provisions for whalers. They applied on 25 July 1814 and received the licence on 8 August.2nd whaling voyage (1814–1817): Captain U. Bunker sailed from London on 26 July 1814, bound for Timor. On 9 November 1816, Hercules, Bunker, master, was at the Cape of Good Hope, having come from Timor and Madagascar. She returned to Gravesend, Kent on 9 February 1817.

The registers did not publish in 1817 and Hercules did not appear in the registers for 1818.

Citations and referencesCitationsReferences'''
 
 
 

1812 ships
Age of Sail merchant ships of England
Whaling ships